Alex Roelse (born January 10, 1995) is an American water polo player. He competed in the men's tournament at the 2016 Summer Olympics.

Roelse competed for UCLA from 2014 to 2017. He was a member of UCLA's 2014 NCAA Water Polo Championship team.

References

External links
 

1995 births
Living people
American male water polo players
Olympic water polo players of the United States
Water polo players at the 2016 Summer Olympics
Sportspeople from Gorinchem
Pan American Games gold medalists for the United States
Pan American Games medalists in water polo
Water polo players at the 2015 Pan American Games
Medalists at the 2015 Pan American Games
21st-century American people